Gail Boyle  is a British curator. She is the Senior Curator of Archaeology at Bristol Museums, Galleries & Archives, former Chair of the Society for Museum Archaeology, and an Honorary Research Fellow at the University of Bristol. She was elected as a fellow of the Society of Antiquaries of London on 2 February 2015. She is also a fellow of the Museums Association.

Publications
Boyle, G. 2007. "One object, several thousand pieces . . . and no budget: the Newton St Loe Mosaic Project", The Museums Archaeologist 30, 49-53.
Boyle, G. 2019. "Always on the Receiving End? Reflections on Archaeology, Museums and Policy", The Historic Environment: Policy & Practice 10 (3-4), 380-394.

References

Living people
British curators
Year of birth missing (living people)
Fellows of the Museums Association
Fellows of the Society of Antiquaries of London